The Modesto Maniax are a football team in the Independent Women's Football League based in Modesto, California. Home games are played on the campus of Modesto Christian School.

Two of the team's players were featured on CNN's Larry King Live in 2010, one of King's last shows.

Season-By-Season

|-
|2009 || 0 || 8 || 0 || 24th Tier II || --
|-
|2010* || 0 || 1 || 0 || 4th Tier II West Pacific West || --
|-
!Totals || 0 || 9 || 0
|colspan="2"| 

* = Current Standing

Season Schedules

2009

2010

References

External links 
Modesto Maniax official website
IWFL official website

Independent Women's Football League
Sports in Stanislaus County, California
Sports in Modesto, California
American football teams in California
American football teams established in 2009
2009 establishments in California
Women's sports in California